Louisa Jacobson Gummer (born June 12, 1991) is an American actress and model. She is best known for playing Marian Brook on the HBO series The Gilded Age.

Early life
Jacobson was born in Los Angeles, California, on June 12, 1991, to actress Meryl Streep and sculptor Don Gummer. She is the younger sister of musician Henry Gummer and actresses Mamie Gummer and Grace Gummer. She attended Poly Prep Country Day School and graduated from Vassar College in 2013 majoring in psychology. She also attended British American Drama Academy three-week summer programme in Oxford and is a graduate of the Yale School of Drama with a master of fine arts in acting.

Career 
On stage, Jacobson made her professional acting debut as Mary Dalton in Yale Repertory Theatre’s production of Nambi E. Kelley’s Native Son, directed by Seret Scott.

In 2018, she starred in Williamstown Theatre Festival’s production of Carson McCullers’ play Member of the Wedding, opposite Tavi Gevinson and directed by Gaye Taylor Upchurch.

In 2019, she starred as Juliet in The Old Globe’s production of Romeo and Juliet.

In 2022, she made her television debut starring in Julian Fellowes' HBO series The Gilded Age opposite Christine Baranski and Cynthia Nixon.

She uses the surname Jacobson, which is her middle name, as there already is an actress named Louisa Gummer, and the Screen Actors Guild (SAG) requires that 'no member use a professional name which is the same as, or resembles so closely as to tend to be confused with the name of any other member'

References

External links 
 
 

1991 births
Living people
21st-century American actresses
Actresses from Los Angeles
Alumni of the British American Drama Academy
American female models
American stage actresses
American television actresses
Female models from California
Meryl Streep
Models from Los Angeles
Poly Prep alumni
Vassar College alumni
Yale School of Drama alumni